COPS (Central Organization of Police Specialists) is a 1988 animated television series released by DIC Animation City, and distributed by Claster Television. The series focuses on a team of highly trained police officers tasked with protecting the fictional Empire City from a group of gangsters led by the "Big Boss". The tag lines for the series are "Fighting crime in a future time" and "It's crime fightin' time!" In 1993, the series was shown in reruns on CBS Saturday mornings under the new name CyberCOPS, due to the 1989 debut of the unrelated primetime reality show of the same name. The show was based on Hasbro's 1988 line of action figures called C.O.P.S. 'n' Crooks, which were designed by Bart Sears.

Overview

In the year 2020, Brandon "Big Boss" Babel and his gang of crooks are causing crime to run rampant in Empire City enough for the Empire City Police Department to be unable to stop him.

Mayor Davis requests federal assistance. The FBI sends in Special Agent Baldwin P. Vess (Codename: Bulletproof) to help take down Big Boss. However, Vess suffers very serious injuries in a car wreck during a fight with Big Boss' criminal henchmen and has to be taken to the hospital. Facing years of rehabilitation, Vess is outfitted with a cybernetic bulletproof torso that allows him to walk again.

While staying at the hospital and knowing he cannot do all of this alone, Bulletproof, sends out Empire City police officer P.J. O'Malley (Codename: LongArm) and rookie officer Donny Brooks (Codename: Hardtop) to round up the best law enforcers from all over the country. With these men and women consisting of David E. "Highway" Harlson, Colt "Mace" Howards, Stan "Barricade" Hyde, Tina "Mainframe" Cassidy, Walker "Sundown" Calhoun, Suzie "Mirage" Young, Hugh S. "Bullseye" Forward, and Rex "Bowser" Pointer and his robot dog Blitz, he forms a team that is "the finest law enforcement agency there is in the country". Bulletproof becomes the proud founder and commander of COPS. Together, he and his COPS team are able to take down Big Boss and his gang of crooks and thwart the first of many of Big Boss' criminal schemes.

Each episode has a title that begins with "The Case of..." with a different phrase being added to it (e.g. "The Case of the Iron C.O.P.S. and Wooden CROOKS"; "The Case of the Half-Pint Hero"; and "The Case of the Crime Nobody Heard") along with the COPS file number. Bulletproof would narrate at the beginning of the episode as well as at the end, concluding by repeating the COPS file number and title, ending it with "Case Closed" with a "Closed" mark being stamped onto the file folder. The two exceptions are the first parts of each of the two-part episodes, "The Case of Big Boss' Master Plan" and "The Case of C.O.P.S. File #1", where the conclusion of the episode is marked with a "Case Continued" plastered on the files.

In the cartoon, the COPS frequently shouted, "It's crime fighting time!" as a battle cry when it was time to bag the CROOKS and solve a caper. Meanwhile, the CROOKS would shout "Crime's a-wasting!" whenever they went to do another caper, whether it was pulling another heist (as in so many episodes such as "The Case of the Blur Bandits"), giving C.O.P.S. a hard time to the point of replacing (actually disposing) them for good (as in "The Case of the Big Boss' Master Plan") or taking captive a certain individual to be held prisoner for ransom (as in "The Case of the Ransomed Rascal").

The music for the series was created by Shuki Levy, while the COPS theme music was written and composed by Haim Saban.

Numerous characters were featured in the cartoon that did not have action figures (including Mainframe, Brian O'Malley, Whitney Morgan, Nightshade, Ms. Demeanor, and Mirage).

Characters

COPS
COPS is short for Central Organization of Police Specialists. They were assembled in order to combat C.R.O.O.K.S. and other bad guys. Characters include:

 Baldwin P. "Bulletproof" Vess (voiced by Ken Ryan) – The leader of COPS and chief of police of Empire City as well as the only COP to appear in every single episode, Baldwin P. Vess is a Federal Agent from the FBI who was called in to help take down Big Boss. During the fight, he ends up seriously injured in a car wreck and is taken to the hospital. To save his life, Mayor Davis had the research scientists from the Overdine Institute perform an operation that gives Baldwin a cybernetic torso to save his life as it would take years for his torso to recover. Going by the name "Bulletproof" due to the cybernetic torso being able to deflect bullets, Baldwin assembles a team of highly trained police officers from across the country to form COPS and stop Big Boss and his gang of crooks. His cybernetic torso is computer-compatible as seen when he accessed the computer on Big Boss's Ultimate Crime Machine to stop it from crashing into Empire City as seen in "The Case of C.O.P.S File 1" part 2 and is able to carry a six-pack of small electronic grenades as seen in "The Case of the Bogus Justice Machines". He is representative of a Police Detective or an F.B.I. Agent.
 P.J. "LongArm" O'Malley (voiced by John Stocker) – P.J. O'Malley serves as a police sergeant for the Empire City Police Department. Second-in-command of COPS, he is a very compassionate officer who has the talent to convince juvenile delinquents to give up their criminal ways and become law-abiding citizens. He wears a wrist device that extends out a handcuff-like device to grab criminals escaping the law, or as an improvised grappling hook. LongArm is representative of a beat cop.
 Rex "Bowser" Pointer (voiced by Nick Nichols) – A police officer who worked for the Chicago Police Department. He loves animals and is the handler of Blitz. Bowser is representative of a K-9 officer.
 Blitz – Bowser's robotic dog who thinks like a human being.
 Walker "Sundown" Calhoun (voiced by Len Carlson) – A former Texas Sheriff that often wears a cowboy hat. He is an excellent lasso handler and sharpshooter known for conducting special investigations. Sundown is representative of a Texas Ranger.
 Susie "Mirage" Young (voiced by Elizabeth Hanna) – A female police officer who worked with the San Francisco Police Department. She is known for her talented work in undercover investigations. Mirage is representative of a vice officer.
 Sgt. Colt "Mace" Howards (voiced by Len Carlson) – A police sergeant who worked for the S.W.A.T. Philadelphia Police Department. He is known for his tactical strategies, his laser "Mazooka", and his love for a femme fatale named Nightshade. Mace is representative of a S.W.A.T. officer.
 Dave E. "Highway" Harlson (voiced by Ray James) – A police officer who worked for the California Highway Patrol. He is a known ace cycle trooper who is not good at baking cookies. Highway is representative of a motorcycle patrol officer.
 Stan "Barricade" Hyde (voiced by Ray James) – A soft-spoken police officer who worked for the Detroit Metro. He is known for his calm demeanor, his M.U.L.E. device, and crowd control. Barricade is representative of Riot Control. He also seems to have training in hostage negotiation.
 Donny "Hardtop" Brooks (voiced by Darrin Baker) – A rookie police officer who works for Empire City's Police Department. He is the driver of the COPS' Ironsides vehicle and has a crush on ECTV news reporter Whitney Morgan. Hardtop is representative of a patrol and pursuit officer.
 Hugh S. "Bullseye" Forward (voiced by Peter Keleghan) – A police officer who worked for the Miami Police Department. He is the best police helicopter pilot on the force which earned him the nickname "Bullseye". Bullseye is representative of a police helicopter pilot.
 Tina "Mainframe" Cassidy (voiced by Mary Long) – A police computer specialist who works for Empire City's Police Department. She is the best computer jockey ever whose talent in computer wizardry has helped solve even the most chaotic of capers. Mainframe is representative of a police technical analyst.
 Wayne R. "CheckPoint" Sneeden III (voiced by Ron Rubin) – A military officer who grew up in Alabama. He works for the United States Army and joins forces with COPS. Very fearful, nervous, anxious, but stays on the case with the team anyway to help get the job done. Appearing in "The Case of Mukluk's Luck", "The Case of the Iron C.O.P.S and Wooden Crooks", and "The Case of the Red Hot Hoodlum" where he had major roles in those episodes. CheckPoint's toy File Card says his "father was a member of a top-secret military team in the '80s and '90s", referencing G.I. Joe character Beach Head (AKA Wayne R. Sneeden). He is representative of a U.S. Army military police officer.
 Hy "Taser" Watts (voiced by Len Carlson) – A police officer who worked with the Seattle Police Department and is known for tasering crooks who try to resist arrest. He appeared in a few episodes, but his major role was in "The Big Boss's Big Switch".
 Robert E. "A.P.E.S." Waldo – A police officer who worked with the Boston Police Department. He has a pair of long grappling hand devices similar to LongArm's powercuffs. A.P.E.S. is short for Automated Police Enforcement System. He appeared in "The Case of the High Iron Hoods".
 Roger "Airwave" Wilco – A police officer who worked with the Los Angeles Police Department and is a good communications expert.
 Francis "Inferno" Devlin – A firefighter who worked with the San Francisco Fire Department. He appeared in a few episodes including "The Case of the Bad Luck Burglar".
 Dudley "Powderkeg" Defuze – A police officer who worked with the Washington D.C. Police Department that is known for disarming and defusing bombs and other types of explosives. He helped Squeeky Kleen neutralize the Midas Glove that Squeeky wore in "The Case of the Midas Touch".
 Max "Nightstick" Mulukai – A police officer who worked with the Honolulu Police Department and is an expert in martial arts. He appeared in a few episodes including "The Case of the Missing Memory".
 Sherman A. "Heavyweight" Patton – A military officer who worked at Fort Leavenworth. He joined up with COPS where he serves as their A.T.A.C. (short for Armored Tactical Attack Craft) driver.

C.R.O.O.K.S.
C.R.O.O.K.S. is a crime syndicate that commits crimes in Empire City. Known members include:

 Brandon "Big Boss" Babel (voiced by Len Carlson imitating Edward G. Robinson) – The primary villain of the series. Brandon "Big Boss" Babel is a crime lord who plans to rule Empire City with a literal iron fist and he is also a businessman while in public. He is portrayed as being obese, yet is able to walk normally. 
 Scratch – Big Boss' pet weasel with metal paws and cybernetic armor. He is always seen in the company of Big Boss.
 Berserko (voiced by Paul De La Rosa) – Barney L. Fatheringhouse is an impulsive, dim-witted thug who is the proud nephew of Big Boss. He is called "Berserko" because his methods are often seen as crazy or bizarre. Berserko once robbed a party supply store wearing a mask he just bought from the same store.
 Rock Krusher (voiced by Brent Titcomb) – Edmund Scarry is a super-strong thug who works for Big Boss. He often uses a heavy-duty jackhammer in order to get into bank vaults. At one point, Rock Krusher was romantically involved with fellow super-strong operative Ms. Demeanor. He wears striped-clothes reminiscent of an old prisoner's uniform.
 Ms. Demeanor (voiced by Paulina Gillis) – Stephanie Demeanor is a middle-aged, super-strong woman with the appearance of a normal businesswoman. She works for Big Boss. Ms. Demeanor has the muscular physique of a champion bodybuilder and often gets upset when people accuse her of not being feminine.
 Turbo Tu-Tone (voiced by Dan Hennessey) – Ted Stavely is a minion of Big Boss who serves as his getaway driver. He is a skilled mechanic and pilot as well. Turbo Tu-Tone was the one responsible for causing the car wreck that resulted in Baldwin P. Vess gaining a cybernetic torso.
 Doctor Badvibes (voiced by Ron Rubin) – Dr. Percival "Percy" Cranial is a brilliant, though completely deranged mad scientist. Ever since he was fired from Comtrex Technologies Incorporated for stealing top secret electronics, he works for Big Boss devising inventions for his plans and robotic minions for Big Boss's gang. Doctor Badvibes has a glass dome on top of his head which shows his abnormally large brain and is known to create literal brainstorms by charging electricity through his brainwaves to form a cloud that can produce rain, thunder, and lightning.
 Buzzbomb (voiced by Ron Rubin) – A robot created by Doctor Badvibes for companionship that works for Big Boss. He has a buzzsaw on one arm and a clamper on the other. Buzzbomb also seems to have a personality that counters and/or complements Doctor Badvibes in a lot of ways.
 WALDO – A small robot created by Doctor Badvibes that once impersonated Bulletproof to take over and sabotage C.O.P.S.
 Shifty – A shape-shifting android created by Doctor Badvibes.
 Nightmare the Android – An android was created by Doctor Badvibes.
 Nightshade (voiced by Jane Schoettle) – Rafaella Diamond was born into a rich family. She ended up disowned by her parents when she turned to crime stealing expensive and exotic jewellery for the thrill of it, not out of financial needs. Nightshade now works for Big Boss and is secretly in love with Mace who reforms her after Big Boss kidnapped her younger sister to force Nightshade to pull off a major heist.
 Buttons McBoomBoom (voiced by Nick Nichols) – Constantine Saunders is minion of Big Boss. He is seen wearing a red suit and fedora and carries around a violin case that hides his favorite playtoy, a deadly modified Thompson submachine gun with a scope attachment that he uses to blast away at any target at will. In addition, Buttons McBoomBoom hides underneath his suit a cybernetic torso that conceals twin machine guns with which he blasts away after he unbuttons his shirt to reveal them in the heat of battle against either the COPS or a swarm of bugs.
 Squeeky Kleen (voiced by Marvin Goldhar) – Dirk McHugh is a bald and lanky criminal who serves as Big Boss' lackey. He drives Big Boss' limo, cleans his clothes, cleans his office, and once tried to arrange a surprise birthday party for Big Boss, which Berserko ruined by trying to steal a bridge.
 Koo-Koo – A time bomb expert that works for Big Boss.
 Hyena – A criminal mastermind that uses prank-related gimmicks in his crime. He held a criminal contest against Big Boss to determine who will stay in Empire City and who will leave. A challenge like that caused Big Boss to orchestrate Highway's kidnapping in order to get Bulletproof and Barricade to help him. During the criminal games, COPS managed to turn the tables against Hyena and his goons and arrest them. Hyena and his henchmen later inexplicably popped up as minions of Big Boss indicating that the two of them have formed an alliance.
 Bullit – Bullit is a henchman of Hyena. He wears rocket boots and a bullet-shaped helmet strong enough to break safes.
 Louie the Plumber (voiced by Ron Rubin) – A plumber-themed criminal who is a henchman of Hyena. He has a mechanical left arm containing a grappling hook.

Minor criminals
Other villains in this show were either unaffiliated with Big Boss' gang or shown working with them only once. They include:

 The Bugman – A short criminal who uses an insect-controlling device that enables him to control insects to commit his crimes after people stopped showing up to his flea circus. He joined up with Big Boss' gang, but left when he did not get a high pay. This causes Nightshade and Buttons McBoomBoom to steal Bugman's bugs and the insect-controlling device and use them in their crimes. When Mainframe and Bowser and Blitz found him after tailing Gaylord, they find out that Bugman only turned to crime because people stopped coming to see his Flea Circus meaning that he was simply desperate. They help him into regaining his insect-controlling device. Though Buttons and Nightshade are defeated, Bugman is also arrested for trying to steal jewels that the pair stole using Bugman's bugs. He was last seen restarting his flea circus in prison where his entertaining of the guards is a diversion for Gaylord who secretly makes for the keys. In "The Case of the Lesser of Two Weevils", Bugman escapes from prison when Gaylord gets captured by his rival the Boll Weevil. When Boll Weevil was defeated, Bugman and Gaylord went back to show business.
 Gaylord – A weevil who is the Bugman's favorite insect. He leads Bugman's insects in Bugman's crime spree.
 Joseph "Jim" Vargas – The corrupt head of the city council who was bribed by Big Boss to make the Instant Justice Machines. When the Instant Justice Machines caught Mace and Barricade trespassing in Vetrocon, he called Big Boss about what to do. When COPS storms Vetrocon, Vargas unleashes the Instant Justice Machines on them. When Mace and Barricade catch up to Vargas, he threatens to blow up the factory with him alongside it. He then demands immunity and an offer to name names of anyone involved. Barricade is able to convince Vargas that suicide would be a waste. Vargas then realizes he doesn't want to kill himself and the people in the factory, so he gives himself up and is sentenced to prison.
 Instant Justice Machines – A bunch of robots built by Vargas in order to put COPS out of business. They act not only as police officers, but also as judges and jailers leaving the culprit trapped until a police car comes by. Some of the crimes they busted involved a man illegally parking on a spot that is only allowed on Tuesdays, a woman jaywalking, a man littering when his hat fell off in the wind while carrying groceries, and two teens speeding on their skateboards. When it came to Highway busting Ms. Demeanor, an Instant Justice Machine found her innocent of all charges. The Instant Justice Machines ended up fighting COPS when they stormed Vetrocon. Barricade even talked the Instant Justice Machine guarding him and Mac into releasing them. When Mace and Barricade end up cornering Vargas, the other Instant Justice Machines stopped their attacks. Following Vargas' arrest, most of the Instant Justice Machines were deactivated except for the one that Barricade talked into freeing him and Mace. The Instant Justice Machine in COPS' possession reappeared in "The Case of the Big Boss' Master Plan" two-part episode.
 Johnny Yuma – Johnny Yuma is the former partner of Sundown who became an outlaw. He was put away by Sundown for trying to steal the money they recovered from a robbery and various train robberies. He eventually escapes from the Texas State Prison to take revenge on Sundown. When Turbo Tu-Tone sees him, he calls up Big Boss who instructs him to follow Johnny and know his every move. Sundown hears of Johnny's prison break and manages to confront him when he breaks into the cowboy museum to regain his lasso, from the Outlaws Hall of Fame. Johnny manages to lasso Sundown to a robotic bull. As Johnny heads out to rob the Silver Bullet Express, Turbo Tu-Tone trails him and turns on the robotic bull to stall Sundown. Upon being tipped off by Turbo Tu-Tone, Big Boss sends Berserko, Rock Krusher, and Buttons McBoomBoom to recruit Johnny Yuma. When the three rendezvous with Turbo Tu-Tone to recruit Johnny Yuma into Big Boss' gang, Johnny Yuma tells them that he works alone and defeats them. Johnny then leaves to go rob the Silver Bullet Express prompting Berserko to lead the Turbo Tu-Tone, Rock Krusher, and Buttons McBoomBoom into robbing it first. Sundown manages to catch up to Johnny Yuma on the Silver Bullet Express and ends up fighting him until Big Boss' minions crash the fight. After Berserko, Turbo Tu-Tone, Rock Krusher, and Buttons McBoomBoom were defeated, Johnny Yuma agrees to return to jail to finish his sentence which led to an early release due to good behavior. He now works as a deputy in a small Texas town.
 Small Guy – A pint-sized criminal who ran his own gang.
 Jenny Wringer – A female con artist.
 Big Momma – An old lady who is Big Boss's mother and Berserko's grandmother. She is blind to the fact that her son is not as skinny as she thought him to have been. When she once visited Empire City to visit her son, Big Boss had to cover up his criminal side by stating that he is a philanthropist and even started an orphanage with his henchmen posing as orphans. Due to his mother being around, he was not able to successfully steal the money and had to donate it to charity. In "The Case of the Lost Boss", she secretly moves to Kansas and orchestrates her son's kidnapping before he can plan a heist on Stargy Island's diamond mines. Big Momma's kidnapping of Big Boss caused his henchman to blame the COPS for Big Boss' disappearance causing them to capture Barricade. Berserko tails the COPS when they run into Big Momma and informs Doctor Badvibes that Big Boss is at Big Momma's apartment. The C.R.O.O.K.S managed to swipe Big Boss from Big Momma's apartment so that they can get on with their plans to take over Stargy Island. COPS thwarted Big Boss' plans causing him to escape with Big Momma.
 Mukluk – A tricky Canadian thief.
 Boll Weevil – An insect-themed villain. He once captured Gaylord causing Bugman to escape from prison to get him back.
 Addictem – A drug dealer who was selling Crystal Twists that were causing people to become addicted to them. He tried to join Big Boss' gang only to be denied since Big Boss does not deal in drugs. Because of Addictem spreading his Crystal Twist drugs across Empire City and Berserko falling into a Crystal Twist crate trying to steal a cache of Mayan Gold, Big Boss and his gang had to team up with COPS to stop Addictem's drug ring. When Addictem was chased into the hospital and grabbed by Berserko, Addictem surrendered to COPS to evade getting beaten up by Berserko. Addictem was sentenced to life in prison and those who were affected by the Crystal Twists are recovering from them. Big Boss and his gang went right back to committing their intended crime after his arrest.

Supporting characters
 Mayor Davis – The mayor of Empire City.
 Commissioner Highwater – The female police commissioner of Empire City.
 Whitney Morgan (voiced by Jeri Craden) – ECTV top reporter who is referred to as the prettiest reporter in Empire City who Hardtop has a crush on.
 Beamer – Whitney Morgan's camera robot.
 Brian O'Malley – LongArm's son.

Minor characters
 Judge Davis – Mayor Davis' twin brother.
 Linda O'Malley – LongArm's wife.
 Mickey O'Malley – LongArm's dad, Brian's grandfather and special advisor to C.O.P.S.
 President of the United States – An unnamed African-American female.
 Suds Sparko – A criminal put away by Mickey O'Malley in the 1990s, who later became Rock Krusher's cellmate. Before he was arrested, he was able to hide his loot in a laundromat.
 Brannigan – Mayor Davis' assistant who's revealed to be a spy for Big Boss.
 Prince Baddin – A bratty spoiled foreign prince who was kidnapped for ransom by Berserko and Rock Krusher. They brought him to "Uncle Fatty Big Boss" and try to hold him for ransom only for the prince to manipulate the crooks into catering to his every whim, prompting the Boss to send him back to the COPS. Later the Prince learned his lesson when he tried to get on a broken down Ferris wheel to ride it only to find himself trapped on the Ferris wheel with the seats coming loose. After being rescued by LongArm, Baddin decides to change his ways and become a good prince rather than a spoiled bad prince leading the king to change his name to from Baddin to Goodin.
 Kathleen Diamond – Nightshade's little sister.
 Greasy – A cellmate of Rock Krusher's at Greystone Prison.
 Samantha – A tomboy who helps the COPS out during an investigation Doctor Badvibes' circus.
 Captain Crimefighter – Cindy Johnson is a teenage girl who dreams of being a superhero. She assisted the C.O.P.S. in one of their cases.
 Inspector Yukon – A police inspector attached to the RCMP. First appeared in "The Case of the Iceberg Pirates". Yukon's mission was to transport an aid package from the Canadian government to replenish Empire City's depleted water reserves.
 Agent Belson – An Executive Protection Unit agent (this show's version of the Secret Service).

Home video and episodes
Sterling Entertainment released a DVD called C.O.P.S. – Fighting Crime in a Future Time on November 13, 2003. Unlike the later released boxsets, Part 1 of "The Case of C.O.P.S. File #1" includes the introduction scenes of Highway and Sundown.

Shout! Factory and Sony BMG Music Entertainment released C.O.P.S. – Volume 1 on February 28, 2006, a four-disc boxset featuring the first 22 uncut episodes on DVD in its original broadcast presentation in Region 1. It includes original concept art, storyboard-to-screen, and some of the original PSAs that were shown after the episodes. Volume 2 featuring 21 episodes was released as a Shout! Factory select title, available exclusively through their online store.

Mill Creek Entertainment acquired the rights to the series, releasing Volume 1, featuring the first 32 episodes of the series, on February 15, 2011. Volume 2, featuring the remaining 33 episodes, was released on September 13, 2011. They released C.O.P.S. – The Complete Series on DVD in Region 1 on March 14, 2017.

Volume 1

Volume 2

C.O.P.S. for Kids
At the end of each episode of C.O.P.S., a special Public service announcement (PSA) segment known as C.O.P.S. for Kids is shown either in animated form featuring the C.O.P.S. and CROOKS or in live action form with real-life police officers giving kids information about safety issues. These included staying away from drugs, gangs, how to be safe at home and on the street, and how to help in preventing crime. Each and every C.O.P.S. for Kids segment was made with the blessing and assistance of organizations like DARE, the National Crime Prevention Council and the California Highway Patrol. These segments were omitted from some international broadcasts of the show.

Broadcast
C.O.P.S. was released into syndication in 1988. The program was re-titled Cyber C.O.P.S. and re-run on CBS from March 27 to September 4, 1993. It was re-run again on the USA Network from January 2 to March 9, 1995, under its original title.

Comics 
A 15-issue series based on the show was published by DC Comics.

Reception
Hal Erickson, author of Television Cartoon Shows, An Illustrated Encyclopedia stated that "C.O.P.S. had potential though it was a potential left unrealized by the dishearteningly flat animation style". Erickson noted that C.O.P.S. "scored with a sturdy inner lining of social satire" such as Mayor Davis' cost-cutting attempts that would unwittingly aid the cause of the villain. IGN gave the show a rating of three out of ten, stating that "to fully appreciate this series one must have a tolerance for clunky, mechanical animation (the kind that says 'We really didn't spend too much money on it') and a love for '80s-style action"; and that "it offers little in terms of character development. I mean, all any kid needs to know is the C.O.P.S are the good guys and Big Boss and crew are the bad guys. Beyond that, the cartoon does offer one element to behold: its emphasis on gadgetry".

Notes

References

External links

 
 
 COPS at Facebook

1988 American television series debuts
1988 American television series endings
1980s American animated television series
1988 Canadian television series debuts
1988 Canadian television series endings
1980s Canadian animated television series
Television series set in 2020
Television series set in the future
First-run syndicated television programs in the United States
Television series by DIC Entertainment
English-language television shows
Television shows based on Hasbro toys
Fictional law enforcement agencies
American children's animated action television series
American children's animated adventure television series
American children's animated science fiction television series
Canadian children's animated action television series
Canadian children's animated adventure television series
Canadian children's animated science fiction television series
Television series by Claster Television